Bi Yirong (born 1996) is a Chinese competitive swimmer who won the gold medal in the 800 meter freestyle at the 2014 Asian Games. She also won a silver medal in 400 meter freestyle there. She specializes in freestyle. In 2016, she joined the University of Michigan swim team. She has produced a total of two international medals, one gold and one silver, both in the 2014 Asian Games.

Personal life
Bi was born in Hangzhou in 1996. Her given name Yirong expresses her father's wish that she would have an easy life; it is literally the Chinese word for "easy" with the syllables reversed and a "tree" radical added to the character for "róng", making it into a homophonous morpheme meaning "banyan".

Swimming career

2013 Chinese National Championships
At the 2013 Chinese National Championships, Bi won a gold medal in the 800 meter freestyle. With a time of  8:36.01, she finished almost three seconds ahead of 2nd-place finisher Liu Yiru and five seconds ahead of 3rd-place finisher Yan Siyu. She also won a gold medal in the 400 meter freestyle, a day before she won the 800 meter. She finished with a time of 4:09.41, finishing four seconds ahead of 2nd and 3rd-place finisher Zhang Yufei and Yan Siyu.

2014 Asian Games
At the 2014 Asian Games, Bi won a gold medal in the 800 meter freestyle. She finished with a time of 8:27.54, finishing ahead of Chinese teammate Xu Danlu and Japanese swimmer Asami Chida. She also won a silver medal in the 400 meter freestyle with a time of 4:08.23, one second behind 1st-place finisher Zhang Yuhan.

University of Michigan
In January 2016, Bi joined the University of Michigan swim team.

College honors
Source:
Two-time NCAA All-American (2016: 500-yard Freestyle, 1,650-yard Freestyle) 
• Big Ten champion (2016: 800-yard Freestyle Relay) 
• All-Big Ten (2016: First Team) 
• CSCAA Scholar All-American (2016)

Sophomore (2016–17) 
• Big Ten Swimmer of the Week (Oct. 12) 
• USA College Challenge (Nov. 12-13): Finished 3rd in the 500-yard Freestyle (4:39.16) and the 1000-yard Freestyle (9:28.38), and 5th in the 400-yard IM (4:10.43).

Freshman (2015–16) 
• Two-time NCAA All-American (2016: 500-yard Freestyle, 1,650-yard Freestyle) 
• Big Ten champion (800-yard Freestyle Relay) 
• All-Big Ten (First Team) 
• CSCAA Scholar All-American 
• NCAA Championships (March 16–19): Finished 3rd in 1,650-yard Freestyle (15:45.26), 5th in 500-yard Freestyle (4:35.76) and 23rd in 400-yard IM (4:10.34). 
• Big Ten Championships (Feb. 17-20): Finished 2nd in both the 500-yard Freestyle (4:35.69) and 1,650-yard Freestyle (15:50.56), and 3rd in the 400-yard IM (4:08.56).

References

1996 births
Living people
Chinese female freestyle swimmers
Chinese female medley swimmers
Swimmers at the 2014 Asian Games
Medalists at the 2014 Asian Games
Asian Games gold medalists for China
Asian Games silver medalists for China
Asian Games medalists in swimming
Ross School of Business alumni
Sportspeople from Hangzhou
Michigan Wolverines women's swimmers
Chinese expatriate sportspeople in the United States